Voerde ([]) is a town in the district of Wesel, in North Rhine-Westphalia, Germany.

City structure
According to art. 1(3) of the Main Charter of the town, the municipal area is divided into the 11 quarters of Götterswickerhamm, Löhnen, Mehrum, Möllen, Voerde, Stockum, Holthausen, Friedrichsfeld, Emmelsum, Spellen and Ork. These quarters are, however, not localities in the sense of article 39 of the North Rhine-Westphalian Municipal Code (GO NW).

History
Voerde owes its name to a ford crossing of a branch of the River Rhine, which existed there during Roman and Frankish times (the old spelling for Furt was Fuerdt). In 1244, the town was mentioned in records for the first time as a fiefdom and castle of the abbey of Werden. In 1804, during the time of the French occupation, Voerde was integrated into the Amt Götterswickerhamm, which was renamed to Voerde in 1911.
During World War II, the 9th US-Army crossed the Rhine in the night of 23 to 24 March 1945 in the area of Voerde and reached the right Rhine-bank for the first time (Operation Plunder).
Since 1975 Voerde is part of the district of Wesel.

Buildings and constructions
 Pylons of Voerde
 Haus Voerde: Moated castle
 Haus Wohnung: Moated castle

Politics
At the last communal-election in Voerde the SPD became the strongest party. The incumbent mayor is Dirk Haarmann (SPD).

Twin towns – sister cities

Voerde is twinned with:
 Alnwick, England, United Kingdom
 Handlová, Slovakia

Transport
Voerde Main Station is located in the town centre at the railway track Oberhausen-Arnhem. A second station, Voerde-Friedrichsfeld, is located 4 km northern.
Important waterways, the Rhine and the Wesel-Datteln-channel, cross Voerde's area.

Sports
There are 11 shooting clubs, 2 Tennis clubs and a riding club in Voerde.
The most important sport club is the TV Voerde.

Education
There are 7 elementary schools, one gymnasium, one comprehensive school, one secondary school and one school for mentally handicapped pupils.

Notable people
Karl Topp (1895–1981), naval officer in World Wars I and II
Heike Schulte-Mattler (born 1958), athlete, Olympic medalist

References

Towns in North Rhine-Westphalia
Wesel (district)